Tritonaclia melania is a moth in the  subfamily Arctiinae. It was described by Oberthür in 1923. It is found in Madagascar.

References

Natural History Museum Lepidoptera generic names catalog

Arctiinae
Moths described in 1923